Mary Aiken may refer to:

 Mary Aiken Littauer (1912–2005), horse expert
 Mary Aiken (psychologist), Irish cyber psychologist, and inspiration for the CSI: Cyber character Avery Ryan
 Mary Aiken, fictional character in Andy Warhol's Bad

See also
 Loretta Mary Aiken (1894–1975), American standup comedian